Horacio Priani (21 May 1912 – 29 May 1964) was an Argentine film actor.

Selected filmography
 The Gaucho Priest (1941)
 His Best Student (1944)
 Women's Refuge (1946)
 The Cat (1947)
 My Poor Beloved Mother (1948)
 Spring of Life (1957)

References

Bibliography 
 The American Film Institute Catalog of Motion Pictures Produced in the United States: Feature Films, 1961 - 1970: Feature Films. University of California Press, 1999.

External links 
 

1912 births
1964 deaths
Argentine male film actors
20th-century Argentine male actors